Henry Joshua Spooner (August 6, 1839 – February 9, 1918), was a United States representative from Rhode Island.

Born in Providence, Rhode Island, Spooner attended the common schools and graduated from Brown University in 1860. During his undergraduate career Spooner became a member of Theta Delta Chi. After graduation, he studied law before entering the Union Army in 1862 as second lieutenant in the Fourth Regiment, Rhode Island Volunteer Infantry. He served in the Army of the Potomac and the Army of the James, mostly in the XVIII Corps.

Law career
After the end of the Civil War, Spooner was admitted to the bar in 1865 and commenced practice in Providence. In 1847, Spooner joined future Providence mayor Augustus S. Miller in partnership in a law firm, which later included Arthur J. Brown.

Political career
He became the commander of the department of Rhode Island, Grand Army of the Republic, in 1877, before joining the political ranks as member of the Rhode Island House of Representatives from 1875-1881. During his career in the state house, Spooner served as speaker 1879-1881.

In 1881 he was elected as a Republican to the 47th United States Congress to fill the vacancy caused by the resignation of Nelson W. Aldrich and he was reelected to the Forty-eighth and to the three succeeding Congresses and served from December 5, 1881, to March 3, 1891. While in Congress, Spooner served as chairman of United States House Committee on Accounts during the 51st United States Congress. In 1890, Spooner was an unsuccessful candidate for reelection to Congress.

After a 12 year political hiatus, he returned to the Rhode Island State House of Representatives in 1902. He also resumed the practice of law in Providence. Spooner died in that city February 9, 1918 and was interred at Swan Point Cemetery.

References

External links 

1839 births
1918 deaths
Brown University alumni
Republican Party members of the United States House of Representatives from Rhode Island
Speakers of the Rhode Island House of Representatives
19th-century American politicians